National Science Film Festival and Competition(Rashtriya Vigyan Chalchitra Mela) is organised by Vigyan Prasar, the Indian Department of Science and Technology in collaboration with Jahangirabad Media Institute as a part of the Indian Science Congress 2011. It is open to individual producers as well as production houses.

Objective
The festival is an initiative of Vigyan Prasar and the Government of India to promote science films in India. Science filmmaking is not a developed field in India compared to many other developed countries. The festival is meant to bring attention towards the need of quality science film making in the country.

Awards
Category A: Films made by government and non-government institutions / organisations 
Category B: Films made by individual / independent film makers 
Category C: Films made by students pursuing degree / diploma level courses 
Category D: Films made by students studying in class 6th to 12th
Technical Excellence Awards
Special Jury Awards

Winners of National Science Film Festival 2019

Winners of the National Science Film Festival 2019

Category 'Rainbow': Films made by School Students

Winner Golden Beaver Award: Automating Agriculture Directed by Rishu Tiwari
Silver Beaver Award: Everyone is Unique Directed by Alina Nakshbandi
Bronze Beaver Award: Accessible Light Directed by Ananya Jain

References

Official Winners List of the National Science Film Festival 2019

External links 
 Vigyan prasar Video Serial
 Chennaimoms.com Events - Competition @ SRM University
  
  
 
 Source of the logo used https://vigyanprasar.gov.in/wp-content/uploads/Strip-Ad.jpg

Film festivals in India
Mass media in Chennai
Festivals in Tamil Nadu